Sye may refer to:

 Erromangan, a language spoken in Vanuatu
 Sye (2004 film), a 2004 Telugu film
 Sye (2005 film), a 2005 Kannada film
 South Yemen